International Tennis Tour is a tennis video game developed by Loriciel released for the Super NES.

Gameplay
There are practice, exhibition, and career mode where the player is given a generous number of dollars and must compete on the world tennis circuit in order to gain more money. The player can only play as a male tennis player. During the exhibition mode, the rules can be altered along with the opponent.

Players can either represent themselves in a singles tournament, a two-person team in a doubles tournament or their respective home country in a "Nations Cup" tournament It takes approximately 52 in-game weeks in order for a player in career mode to go from being the worst tennis player in the world to being the best tennis player in the world.

Passwords are given out at the end of each match in order to players to continue their progress at a later date.

References

External links
 International Tennis Tour at MobyGames

1993 video games
Super Nintendo Entertainment System games
Super Nintendo Entertainment System-only games
Tennis video games
Taito games
Video games developed in France
Multiplayer and single-player video games
Virtual Studio games